Self Portrait in Miniature is a small oil painting by the Italian artist Sofonisba Anguissola. It was painted around 1556 and mounted on a medal from the same time. The choice of format is based on Angussiola's knowledge of the works of the famous miniaturist Giulio Clovio. The painting is held at the Museum of Fine Arts, in Boston.

Description
The miniature depicts a half-bust self portrait of Sofonisba. She is dressed in an austere everyday dress, with her hair in tresses and gathered around her head. Her hands support a round shield with a complex monogram, showing the letters that make the name of her father Amilcare: ACEILMR. Circling the monogram there is the following inscription, painted in Latin in capital letters. «SOPHONISBA ANGUSSOLA VIR(GO) IPSIUS MANU EX (S)PECULO DEPICTAM CREMONAE».

The portrait is painted with the tip of the brush, on a weathered green background. The physiognomy of the face is typical of the self portraits of Sofonisba Anguissola: wide black eyes,  small fleshly lips, an austere hairstyle and clothing, suitable for a woman from a good family, who wishes to present herself as a virgin, as well as literate and well educated. The raised collar, in the Venetian style, is left open to allow a glimpse of the white shirt underneath.

In the small dimensions of the cameo, the body of the young woman is hidden behind the monogram of her father. He was the probable recipient of the painting, to whom Sononsiba felt herself in debt, since he had given her the chance to study painting under  Bernardino Campi.

References

Portraits of women
Anguissola
Self
1550s paintings